Zhou Jiannan (Simplified Chinese: 周健楠) is a Chinese musician, and zitherist for the popular musical group Twelve Girls Band.

She was born in Beijing, learned to play the pipa (pear-shaped lute) at age seven, and the guzheng (25-stringed zither) at age eight. She graduated from the Central Conservatory of Music, and now teaches the erhu (Chinese violin) at a Beijing university. Her bandmate Zhong Bao (仲宝), who plays the pipa professionally, is one of Jiannan's students.

She won the gold medal in the Beijing Folk Instrumental Music Tournament in 1996. Her birth date is February 15.

Of the members of Twelve Girls Band, Jiannan acts as something of a leader. She also speaks the best English of anyone in the group.

External links
Official Profile
Aggregate Profile at Twelve Girls Band Archives

People's Republic of China musicians
Living people
Musicians from Beijing
Pipa players
Guzheng players
Erhu players
Educators from Beijing
Year of birth missing (living people)